Monorchiidae is a family of flatworms belonging to the order Plagiorchiida.

Genera

Genera:
 Allobacciger Hafeezullah & Siddiqi, 1970
 Alloinfundiburictus Wee, Cutmore, Pérez-del-Olmo & Cribb, 2020
 Allolasiotocus Yamaguti, 1959

References

Platyhelminthes